Mikael Tillström defeated Alex Rădulescu 6–4, 4–6, 7–5 to win the 1997 Chennai Open singles event. Thomas Enqvist was the defending champion.

Seeds

Draw

Finals

Section 1

Section 2

External links
 1997 Chennai Open Singles draw

1997 Chennai Open
Maharashtra Open